The following works deal with the cultural, political, economic, military, biographical and geologic history of pre-territorial Montana, Montana Territory and the State of Montana.

General works in Montana history
 
 
 
 
 
 

 
 
 
 
 
 
 
 , the standard scholarly history
 
 
 
 
 
 Smith, Duane A. Rocky Mountain Heartland: Colorado, Montana, and Wyoming in the 20th Century (2008) 305pp
 
 , classic populist history from longtime University of Montana professor of History.
 , update to Toole's previous works.
 WPA Federal Writers Project. Montana: A State Guide Book (Viking Press, 1939) classic guide to history, culture and every town  online free

Chronologies

Periodicals
 
 
 
 
 
 
 
 
 
 
 , published 1951–present.

Agriculture, ranching, and rural life
 
 , originally published in 1942.

Biography
 
 
 Bates, J. Leonard. "Walsh, Thomas James"; American National Biography Online 2000
 
 
 
 
 
 
 , on William Scallon of the Anaconda Company.
 Karlin, Jules A. "Dixon, Joseph Moore" American National Biography Online (2000)  online
 
 
 , originally published in 1930.
 , originally published in 1935.
 
 
 
 , first published in 1997; chapters on Joseph K. Toole, Ella Knowles, Joseph M. Dixon, Thomas J. Walsh, Jeannette Rankin, Burton K. Wheeler, James E. Murray, Mike Mansfield, and Lee Metcalf
 
 
 
 
 
 Ruetten, Richard T. Burton K. Wheeler, 1905-1925, an independent liberal under fire (1957) 418pp; vol 1 of standard biography; Burton K. Wheeler of Montana: a progressive between the wars (1961) - 662 pages; vol. 2

Memoirs and autobiography
 
 
 
 
 
 
 
 
 
 
 , originally published in 1887.
 , originally published in 1932.
 
 Wheeler, Burton K. Yankee from the West: The candid, turbulent life story of the Yankee-born U.S. Senator from Montana (1962), autobiography

Business, economics, and industry
 
 
 Groth, Clarence W. "Sowing and Reaping: Montana Banking, 1910-1925," Montana, Dec 1970, Vol. 20 Issue 4, pp 28–35
 Klassen, Henry C. "The Early Growth of the Conrad Banking Enterprise in Montana, 1880-1914," Great Plains Quarterly, Jan 1997, Vol. 17 Issue 1, pp 49–62
 Kutzman, John Andrew. "Death of a Small Business: The Missoula Brewing Company," Montana, March 1988, Vol. 38 Issue 1, pp 54–61
 
 
 Walter, Dave. "Simon Pepin, A Quiet Capitalist," Montana March 1989, Vol. 39 Issue 1, pp 34–38
 West, Carroll Van.  "Marcus Daly and Montana: One Man's Imprint on the Land," Montana Mar 1987, Vol. 37 Issue 1, pp 60–62

Historic expeditions

Lewis and Clark Expedition (1804-1806)

Cook, Folsom, Peterson Expedition (1869)

Washburn, Langford, Doane Expedition (1870)

 
 
 The report of Lieutenant Gustavus C. Doane upon the so-called Yellowstone Expedition of 1870, presented to the Secretary of War, February 1871
 The Washburn Yellowstone Expedition, accounts of Trumbull published in the Overland Monthly, Vol 6, No 5-6, May–June 1871

Hayden Geological Survey (1871)

Labor and working class

Indians
 Bigart, Robert. Getting Good Crops: Economic and Diplomatic Survival Strategies of the Montana Bitterroot Salish Indians, 1870-1891 (Civilization of the American Indian Series, Vol. 266)  (2010)
 Bryan, William L. Montana's Indians: Yesterday and Today (Montana Geographic Series)  (1995)  excerpt and text search
 Hoebel, E. Adamson. The Cheyennes: Indians of the Great Plains (1978)
 Lopach, James J. et al. Tribal Government Today: Politics on Montana Indian Reservations (2nd ed. 1998)
 Lowie, Robert H. The Crow Indians (U. of Nebraska Press, 1983)

Military histories
 Fifer, Barbara. Montana Battlefields 1806-1877: Native Americans And the U.S. Army at War (2005)  excerpt and text search

Primary sources

Local and regional histories
 
 
 
 
 Gloege, Marvin E. Survival or gradual extinction: the small town in the Great Plains of eastern Montana (Meadowlark Publishing Services, 2007)
 
 
 
 Mercier, Laurie K.  "'The Stack Dominated Our Lives': Metals Manufacturing In Four Montana Communities," Montana June 1988, Vol. 38 Issue 2, pp 40–57
 
  
  
 
 
 
 WPA Federal Writers Project. Montana: A State Guide Book (Viking Press, 1939) classic guide to every town  online edition

Law and order

Ghost towns
 
 
 Johnson, Virginia Weisel. "Tough Taft: Boom Town." Montana Dec 1982, Vol. 32 Issue 4, pp 50–57

Primary sources

Political histories
 Colde, Judith K. "A Wide Field for Usefulness: Women's Civil Status and the Evolution of Women's Suffrage on the Montana Frontier, 1864-1914," American Journal of Legal History, July 1990, Vol. 34 Issue 3, pp 262–294
 Lemon, Greg. Blue Man in a Red State: Montana's Governor Brian Schweitzer and the New Western Populism   (2008), popular

 Malone, Michael P. "The Montana New Dealers," in John Braeman et al. eds. The New Deal: Volume Two - the State and Local Levels (1975) pp 240–68
 Morrison, John,  and Catherine Wright Morrison. Mavericks: The Lives and Battles of Montana's Political Legends (2003), chapters on Joseph K. Toole, Ella Knowles, Joseph M. Dixon, Thomas Walsh, Jeannette Rankin, Burton K. Wheeler, James E. Murray, Mike Mansfield, and Lee Metcalf 
 O'Keane, Josephine. Thomas J. Walsh: A Senator from Montana(1955)  online edition

 
  Spritzer, Donald E. Senator James E. Murray and the Limits of Post-War Liberalism (1985).
 Swibold, Dennis L. Copper chorus: mining, politics, and the Montana press, 1889-1959 (2006)
 Waldron, Ellis L. Montana politics since 1864: an atlas of elections (1958) 428 pages

Culture
 
 Egan, Ken. Hope And Dread In Montana Literature (Western Literature Series) (2003)
 Harrison, Brady. All Our Stories Are Here: Critical Perspectives on Montana Literature (2009)  excerpt and text search; 12 essays by scholars
 Newby, Rick, and Suzanne Hunger, eds. Writing Montana: literature under the big sky (1996) 27 essays;  excerpt and text search
 Patterson, Caroline, ed. Montana Women Writers: A Geography of the Heart (2006)
 WPA. An Ornery Bunch: Tales and Anecdotes Collected by the WPA Montana Writer's Project 1935-1942 ed. by Megan Hiller, Rick Newby, and Elaine Peterson (1999)

Social history
 
 Colde, Judith K. "A Wide Field for Usefulness: Women's Civil Status and the Evolution of Women's Suffrage on the Montana Frontier, 1864-1914," American Journal of Legal History, July 1990, Vol. 34 Issue 3, pp 262–294
 
 Hickcox, David H. "The Impact of the Great Northern Railway on Settlement in Northern Montana, 1880-1920," Railroad History, Summer 1983, Issue 148, pp 58–67
 Melcher, Mary. "'Women's Matters': Birth Control, Prenatal Care, and Childbirth in Rural Montana, 1910-1940," Montana June 1991, Vol. 41 Issue 2, pp 47–56
 
 Tubbs, Stephenie Ambrose. "Montana Women's Clubs at the Turn of the Century," Montana March 1986, Vol. 36 Issue 1, pp 26–35

Geology

Bibliographies

Original sources

See also

History of Montana
Bibliography of Glacier National Park (U.S.)
Bibliography of the Lewis and Clark Expedition
Bibliography of Yellowstone National Park
Bibliography of Wyoming history

Notes

External links
 
 

History of Montana
Montana history